The 2004 EV1.net Houston Bowl was the fifth edition of the college football bowl game, and was played at Reliant Stadium in Houston, Texas. The game pitted the Colorado Buffaloes from the Big 12 Conference and the UTEP Miners from the Western Athletic Conference (WAC). The game was the final competition of the 2004 football season for each team and resulted in a 33–28 Colorado victory.

Scoring summary
First quarter
Colorado Mason Crosby 26 yard field goal. 3–0 Colorado
UTEP Howard Jackson 7 yard touchdown run. 7–3 UTEP
UTEP Josh Chamois 1 yard touchdown run. 14–3 UTEP

Second quarter
Colorado Hugh Charles 1 yard touchdown run. 14–10 UTEP
Colorado Mason Crosby 54 yard field goal. 14–13 UTEP
UTEP Jordan Palmer 17 yard touchdown pass to Jayson Boyd. 21–13 UTEP

Third quarter
Colorado Mason Crosby 37 yard field goal. 21–16 UTEP
Colorado Mason Crosby 20 yard field goal. 21–19 UTEP

Fourth quarter
UTEP Jordan Palmer 4 yard touchdown pass to Johnnie Lee Higgins, Jr. 28–19 UTEP
Colorado Joel Klatt 78 yard touchdown pass to Joe Klopfenstein. 28–26 UTEP
Colorado Joel Klatt 39 yard touchdown pass to Evan Judge. 33–28 Colorado

Statistics

References

Houston Bowl
Houston Bowl
Colorado Buffaloes football bowl games
UTEP Miners football bowl games
Houston Bowl
December 2004 sports events in the United States
2004 in Houston